0x80 is a hacker interviewed by Brian Krebs of The Washington Post about his lucrative business in running "botnets", or networks of remotely controlled personal computers without the owner's consent. The article in the 2006 February Washington Post detailed 0x80's earnings of around $6,800 a month infecting controlled personal computers with adware and spyware in exchange for a per-computer commission.

Leaked data 

0x80 agreed to be interviewed for the Post article under the condition that he'd not be identified by name or home town.

After a link to the article on Slashdot, a reader used the IPTC information encoded into the image to learn that Roland, Oklahoma had been entered as the picture's location. The Washington Post removed all of the images from their site and commented "As you know we take our obligations with sources very seriously and I don't want to comment about any speculation about sources" in response to an interview question asking "Are you aware that the Post failed to scrub the metadata from the images used in this article, leaving information about your town?" (question text edited by The Washington Post to remove a specific referenced town name).

References

External links

 Washington Post article
 Slashdot comments exposing image metadata
 Post blog about victims of 0x80 hacking

Botnets
Hackers
Unidentified people
 
 
Year of birth missing (living people)
Living people